TUI fly Nordic is a charter airline headquartered in Stockholm, Sweden, and is a part of the TUI Group. It operates short, medium and long-haul flights to leisure destinations from several airports in the Nordic countries, on behalf of the tour operators TUI Danmark (Denmark), TUI Suomi (Finland), TUI Norge (Norway) and TUI Sverige (Sweden). In 2016, the airline carried approximately 1,500,000 passengers.

History
The airline was originally formed in 1985 as Transwede Airways operating both charter and scheduled flights to destinations around Europe. In 1996 the charter part of the airline was taken over by the Swedish tour operator Fritidsresor and was renamed to Blue Scandinavia. Following the acquisition of Fritidsresor by Thomson in 1998 the airline was rebranded as Britannia Nordic. After Preussag (TUI) acquired the Thomson Group in 2000 the airline was rebranded as TUI fly Nordic in 2005.

In 2015 the TUI Group announced that all five of its airline subsidiaries would be rebranded as TUI Airlines, whilst keeping their separate Air Operators Certificate, taking about three years to complete. As of 2017, most aircraft have been repainted and rebranded with the new "Dynamic Wave" livery and name.

Destinations

As of October 2020, TUI fly Nordic serves the following destinations:

Fleet

Current fleet
As of August 2022, the TUI fly Nordic fleet consists of the following aircraft:

Former fleet
TUI fly Nordic formerly operated the following aircraft:

Fleet development
TUI Group has 70 737 MAXs on order for the group. The order consists of 20 MAX 10 aircraft, with the remaining variants unspecified as of June 2017. These will be used for both replacement of older aircraft and further expansion. TUI fly Nordic was scheduled to receive its first of five Boeing 737 MAX 8 in February 2018.

See also
List of airlines of Sweden
Transport in Sweden

References

External links

TUI Airlines Group

Airlines of Sweden
Airlines established in 1996
TUI Group
Swedish companies established in 1996
Companies based in Stockholm
Charter airlines